"Wonderful Life" is a song by British rock band Bring Me the Horizon featuring Cradle of Filth vocalist Dani Filth. Produced by the band's vocalist Oliver Sykes and keyboardist Jordan Fish, it is featured on the group's 2019 sixth studio album Amo. The track was released as the second single from the album on 21 October 2018.

Promotion and release
The track was teased by Oliver Sykes on an Instagram live stream. After searching the tease on Shazam, fans discovered the name for the leaked song as "WONDERFUL LIFE" featuring Cradle of Filth vocalist Dani Filth as a guest. After it, Sykes posted a video on his Instagram account announcing the "Wonderful Life" release date to be 21 October on Radio 1.

Composition and lyrics
"Wonderful Life" has been described as a nu metal and hard rock song. The song shows a troubled narrator barely holding on to life but constantly referring to it as wonderful. The narrator, who seems to hold a dark and depressing view of the world around him, still enjoys the mundane and often gloomy aspects of everydayness. Sykes said of the song's lyrics:

Music video
The music video for "Wonderful Life" was released on the same day as the single was streamed. Directed by Theo Watkins, the video shows clips of the band doing everyday, mundane things. Dani Filth is seen wearing heavy corpse paint and sci-fi-esque stage clothing while eating cereal and shopping at the supermarket. Jordan Fish is shown playing with his son, Oliver Sykes is having his water boiler fixed and sitting on the sofa with his dog, Matt Kean is out running, Lee Malia is seen washing a camper van and mowing his lawn, and Matt Nicholls is shown walking his dog. It features appearances from Fish's real life son, Eliot Fish, and Sykes', Nicholls', and Fish's dogs Luna, Bud, and Bailey.

Personnel
Credits adapted from Tidal.

Bring Me the Horizon
 Oliver Sykes – lead vocals, production, composition
 Lee Malia – guitars, composition
 Matt Kean – bass, composition
 Matt Nicholls – drums, composition
 Jordan Fish – keyboard, synthesizers, programming, percussion, backing vocals, production, composition, programming

Additional musicians
 Dani Filth – guest vocals
 Lewis Reid – contrabass
 Alexander Verster – contrabass
 Jessica Price – contrabass
 Parallax Orchesta – contrabass, strings
 Gavin Kibble – cello
 Rachael Lander – cello
 Max Ruisi – cello
 Madilyn Eve Cutter – cello
 Choir Noir – choir 
 Oliver Hickie – french horn
 Ross Anderson – trombone
 Jane Salmon – trombone
 Simon Dobson – trumpet, strings
 Victoria Rule – trumpet
 Anisa Arslanagic – viola
 Benjamin Kaminski – viola
 Mark Gibbs – viola

Additional personnel
 Robbie Nelson – engineering
 Peter Miles – engineering
 Romesh Dodangoda – engineering
 Alejandro Baima – assistant engineering
 Conor Panayi – assistant engineering
 Francesco Cameli – assistant engineering
 Daniel Morris – assistant engineering
 Ted Jensen – mastering
 Rhys May – mixing
 Dan Lancaster – mixing

In popular culture
"Wonderful Life" is featured in the soundtrack for the video game WWE 2K20, as well as one of the theme songs for NXT TakeOver: WarGames (2018).

Charts

Certifications

References

2018 singles
2018 songs
Bring Me the Horizon songs
RCA Records singles
Songs about loneliness
Songs written by Oliver Sykes
Sony Music singles
Nu metal songs